Noelie McDonnell is an Irish singer-songwriter from Tuam, Co. Galway. His debut release was an EP entitled Downhome in 2004. His debut self-titled album released in 2005, was considered a hit, and its opening song, "Stars" was picked as Ian Dempsey's Song of the Week on Today FM radio programme The Ian Dempsey Breakfast Show.

In June 2008, McDonnell released his second album, Beyond Hard Places. Nearly Four, a song written for McDonnell's nephew got to number 4 in the Irish Download Charts in Autumn, and number 15 in the Irish Singles Chart.

McDonnell has played alongside numerous artists including John Martyn, Roesy, The Saw Doctors, The Chalets, Luka Bloom, The Walls and Mundy.

External links
Official site
Interview with Noelie by Bryan Kremkau

Living people
Irish male singer-songwriters
People from Tuam
Musicians from County Galway
Year of birth missing (living people)